The Education for All Handicapped Children Act (sometimes referred to using the acronyms EAHCA or EHA, or Public Law (PL) 94-142 was enacted by the United States Congress in 1975. This act required all public schools accepting federal funds to provide equal access to education and one free meal a day for children with physical and mental disabilities.  Public schools were required to evaluate children with disabilities and create an educational plan with parent input that would emulate as closely as possible the educational experience of non-disabled students. The act was an amendment to Part B of the Education of the Handicapped Act enacted in 1966.

The act also required that school districts provide administrative procedures so that parents of disabled children could dispute decisions made about their children's education.  Once the administrative efforts were exhausted, parents were then authorized to seek judicial review of the administration's decision.  Prior to the enactment of EHA, parents could take their disputes straight to the judiciary under the Rehabilitation Act of 1973.  The mandatory system of dispute resolution created by EHA was an effort to alleviate the financial burden created by litigation pursuant to the Rehabilitation Act.

PL 94-142 also contains a provision that disabled students should be placed in the least restrictive environment-one that allows the maximum possible opportunity to interact with non-impaired students. Separate schooling may only occur when the nature or severity of the disability is such that instructional goals cannot be achieved in the regular classroom. Finally, the law contains a due process clause that guarantees an impartial hearing to resolve conflicts between the parents of disabled children to the school system.

The law was passed to meet four huge goals:
 To ensure that special education services are available to children who need them
 To guarantee that decisions about services to students with disabilities are fair and appropriate
 To establish specific management and auditing requirements for special education
 To provide federal funds to help the states educate students with disabilities

EHA was revised and renamed as the Individuals with Disabilities Education Act in 1990 for improvement of special education and inclusive education.

Functional relationship between EHA, the Rehabilitation Act, and the equal protection clause 

The Supreme Court decided that EHA would be the exclusive remedy for disabled students asserting their right to equal access to public education in Smith v. Robinson, 468 U.S. 992 (1984).  The petitioner, Tommy Smith, was an eight-year-old student who had cerebral palsy.  The school district in Cumberland, Rhode Island originally agreed to subsidize Tommy's education by placing him in a program for special needs children at the Emma Pendleton Bradley Hospital.  The school district later decided to remove Tommy from that program and send him to the Rhode Island Division of Mental Health, Retardation and Hospitals, which was severely understaffed and underfunded.  This transfer would have effectively terminated Tommy's public education.  Tommy's parents appealed the school district's decision through the administrative process created by EAHCA.  Once the administrative process was exhausted, the Smiths sought judicial review pursuant to the EAHCA, § 504 of the Rehabilitation Act, and 42 U.S.C. § 1983.

The United States Supreme Court held that the administrative process created by EHA was the exclusive remedy for disabled students asserting their right to equal access to education.  "Allowing a plaintiff to circumvent the EHA administrative remedies would be inconsistent with Congress’ carefully tailored scheme...We conclude, therefore, that where the EHA is available to a disabled child asserting a right to a free appropriate public education, based either on the EHA or on the Equal Protection Clause of the Fourteenth Amendment, the EHA is the exclusive avenue through which the child and his parents or guardian can pursue their claim."  The court based its decision on a contextual analysis of the applicable statutes.  To permit a student to rely on § 504 or the § 1983 would be to effectively eliminate the EHA, because it would circumvent the EHA’s requirement that petitioners first exhaust their administrative options before seeking judicial intervention.

In the face of this Supreme Court decision, the United States Congress passed an amendment to the EHA which explicitly overruled the Supreme Court's decision in two ways: (1) The amended law allowed parents to collect attorney's fees upon winning a case against the school. (2) The amended law permitted parents to bring a lawsuit under either EHA, § 504, or § 1983 once the administrative remedies had been exhausted.

Attempt to weaken EHA 
In the 1980s, the Reagan administration attempted to weaken EHA, but Patrisha Wright and Evan Kemp Jr. (of the Disability Rights Center) led a grassroots and lobbying campaign against this that generated more than 40,000 cards and letters. In 1984, the administration dropped its attempts to weaken EHA; however, they did end the Social Security benefits of hundreds of thousands of disabled recipients.

References 
Breakthrough:Federal Special Education Legislation, 1965-1981, Edwin W. Martin, Bardolf& Co., Sarasota, FL. 2013.

Legislation: Understanding and Using Statutes
Smith v. Robinson, 468 U.S. 992 (1984)
Gregory, R., J. (2007). Psychological Testing: History, Principles, and Applications. Psychological Testing and   the Law. 5th ed.

Notes

External links 
Article on EAHCA
Text of the 1975 "Education for All Handicapped Children Act"

1975 in law
94th United States Congress
United States federal education legislation
Special education in the United States
1975 in education
Presidency of Gerald Ford
United States federal disability legislation